Medical Anthropology is a bimonthly peer-reviewed academic journal covering medical anthropology published by Routledge. It was established in 1977. The editors-in-chief are James Staples and Rebecca Marsland (Brunel University London and the University of Edinburgh).

Abstracting and indexing 
The journal is abstracted and indexed in Anthropological Index Online, Current Contents/Social & Behavioral Sciences, EBSCOhost, European Reference Index for the Humanities, International Bibliography of the Social Sciences, Social Sciences Citation Index, PsycINFO, and Scopus.

References

External links 
 

English-language journals
Medical anthropology
Anthropology journals
Routledge academic journals
Healthcare journals
Bimonthly journals
Publications established in 1977